Al-Akhdhar is an archaeological site in Ash Sharqiyah, Oman. It is a cemetery containing with remains dating from the Umm al-Nar, Wadi Suq, Late Iron Age (Samad), and Islamic periods.

Description

The site is located next to the Wadi Samad. In 1973–4, Shaikh Hamdan al-Harthi, a resident of Samad al-Shan, informed the newly formed Department of Antiquities of the existence of pre-Islamic graves at this site. A British team led by D. Brian Doe and Beatrice de Cardi surveyed the site and put it in their gazetteer. In 1974, eight of the graves were excavated, but without any documentation.

In 1980, Gerd Weisgerber began to record the finds and visited the site when he could. In 1981, B. Vogt and A. Tillmann of the German Mining Museum in Bochum excavated the site. Paul Yule used some of the finds for his study of the Samad Late Iron Age. A full report was published in 2015.

This archaeological site, like most in the Sultanate is in danger of being built on or otherwise destroyed.

Further reading
Paul Yule, Die Gräberfelder in Samad al-Shan (Sultanat Oman): Materialien zu einer Kulturgeschichte (2001), .
Paul Yule, Cross-roads – Early and Late Iron Age South-eastern Arabia, Abhandlungen Deutsche Orient-Gesellschaft, vol. 30, Wiesbaden 2014, 
Paul A. Yule, Valourising the Samad Late Iron Age, Arabian Archaeology and Epigraphy 27/1, 2016, 31‒71.
Paul Yule, Gerd Weisgerber, The Cemetery at al-Akhḍar near Samad al-Shān in the Sharqīya (Oman), Der Anschnitt, Yule 2015, 111‒78

See also
 Archaeology of Oman

References

External links
 http://heidicon.ub.uni-heidelberg.de/pool/oman

History of Oman
Archaeological sites in Oman
Ancient Near East